Robert S. Hurtt, Jr. (born May 19, 1944) is a U.S. Republican politician, who was the California State Senate Republican Leader from August 1995 to March 1998.

A native Californian, Hurtt was born in Santa Monica, he has resided in Orange County since graduating from Claremont McKenna College in 1966 with a Bachelor of Arts in economics.

A businessman, Hurtt owns and operates a manufacturing company, Container Supply Company, of which he has been president for over 30 years and currently employs more than 200 people. Under Hurtt's presidency, Container Supply Company donated $278,070 to the 2008 campaign to ban same-sex marriage in California.

Hurtt was elected to the Senate in a 1993 special election with 76% of the vote to represent the 32nd District after Senator Ed Royce vacated the seat to become a member of Congress.  After redistricting, the district was renumbered the 34th District.  During the 1990s, the 34th district consisted of portions of Anaheim, Fountain Valley, Garden Grove, La Palma, Santa Ana, Buena Park, Midway City, Stanton, and Westminster.

Elected to a full term in 1994, his priorities in the Senate were "reducing job-killing business regulation, eliminating wasteful government spending, expanding commitment to public safety, improving education, and reforming tax policies."

In 1998, Hurtt sought a second full term but was unexpectedly upset by attorney Joe Dunn, who defeated Hurtt by 51% to 49%.

Hurtt and his wife, Nancy, have four children and two grandchildren.

References

External links
Join California Rob Hurtt

1944 births
Living people
Republican Party California state senators
Claremont McKenna College alumni
People from Santa Monica, California
20th-century American politicians